Polyptychus nigriplaga is a moth in the family Sphingidae. It is known from central and west Africa.

The length of the forewings is 29–36 mm for males. The forewings and body are pale cinnamon to creamy clay. There is a dark mesial streak on the head and thorax and a dark dot at the base of the forewing and one at the costa, near the apex. The wavy transverse lines of the forewing are very variable in intensity, some specimens being almost unmarked (these are known as form barnsi, although this is sometimes treated as a valid species), others being very heavily marked (form kivui, although this form is sometimes treated as a subspecies). The hindwings are paler, but darker at the tornus. The inner marginal black streak and tornal spots are present but variable. The length of the forewings for females is 33 mm. The apex and tornus are more acute that in the male. The ground colour is russet but darker towards the termen. The wavy transverse lines and stigma are faint, as is the subapical dot. There is no basal dot. The hindwings are uniformly russet with dark tomal spots and a faint inner marginal streak.

Subspecies
Polyptychus nigriplaga nigriplaga
Polyptychus nigriplaga kivui Clark, 1926 (lowland forest from Liberia and the Ivory Coast to the Congo and Uganda)

References

Polyptychus
Moths described in 1903
Insects of Cameroon
Moths of Africa
Insects of the Democratic Republic of the Congo
Insects of Uganda
Fauna of Gabon